The Zeitschrift für Antikes Christentum / Journal of Ancient Christianity is an academic journal published by Walter de Gruyter. It covers topics related to early Christianity and Patristics.

External links

De Gruyter academic journals
Multilingual journals
Journals about ancient Christianity
Publications established in 1997
Triannual journals